World Championships have been held in the Rhythm section of ballroom dancing since they were organised by the National Dance Council of America in 2005. 

American Rhythm dancing covers the dances cha cha, rumba, bolero, swing, and mambo.

World Champions

See also 

Smooth World Champions
Latin World Champions
Standard World Champions
U.S. National Dancesport Champions (Professional Rhythm)
U.S. National Dancesport Champions (Professional 9-Dance)

References

External links
National Dance Council of America

Dancesport